John-James Chalmers (born 20 December 1986) is a Scottish television presenter, public speaker and Invictus Games medallist. He was injured in a bomb blast in Afghanistan in 2011, while serving as a Royal Marine.

Early life
Chalmers was born on 20 December 1986 in Edinburgh, Scotland, the son of John Chalmers, Moderator of the General Assembly of the  Church of Scotland from 2014 to 2015. He attended Strathallan School and studied at the University of Edinburgh, graduating as a Bachelor of Education. He worked as a craft, design and technology teacher at Balerno Community High School in Edinburgh.

As a Royal Marine, he served in Helmand Province, Afghanistan, attached to 42 Commando and had joined the royal marine reserves whilst juggling his career as a teacher.  In May 2011, he sustained severe injuries in an IED blast; he suffered facial injuries, lost two fingers and his right elbow disintegrated. He remained in the Royal Marines during his rehabilitation until 2016.

Invictus Games
In September 2014, Chalmers was a medal winner in non-amputee cycling for Britain at the Invictus Games.  Captaining the trike team, he received a gold medal for the Men's IRecB1 Recumbent Circuit Race, as part of a British trio who crossed the finishing line together.  Earlier that day Chalmers had already won a bronze in the 1-mile time trial.  He also won a bronze medal in the 4 × 100m mixed relay race.

Media career
Chalmers subsequently presented National Paralympic Day for Channel 4, as well as an online show for the 2015 IPC Athletics World Championships in Doha. In July 2016, he returned to the 2016 Invictus Games as an ambassador, telling his story at the opening ceremony as well as working with the BBC in their coverage of the games.

Chalmers featured on The Superhumans Show before travelling to Rio de Janeiro as a presenter for Channel 4's coverage of the 2016 Summer Paralympics, as well as appearing as a guest on The Last Leg series Live from Rio. After returning from Rio he hosted the Team GB's - Olympics and Paralympics Homecoming Parade in Manchester, alongside Mark Chapman and Helen Skelton, which was simulcast on BBC One and Channel 4.

Owing to his background as a Royal Marine, Chalmers presented The People Remember, with Sophie Raworth, a remembrance series honouring heroes both on the battlefield and the home front, shown throughout the week of remembrance, before appearing on the BBC's coverage of Remembrance at the Cenotaph.

Also in 2016 Chalmers was co-commentator of the Lord Mayor's Show on BBC One, a role he has held since.

On 21 February 2017, Chalmers began presenting some of the sports segments on the BBC News channel and BBC Breakfast. He joined the BBC Sport Team, regularly working as a presenter and reporter on annual events like the Great North, Great Manchester Run and The London Marathon. He also joined The One Show as a features Reporter and often pops up on the Green Sofa.

2017 also saw Chalmers begin working in radio, as part of BBC Radio 5 Live's, World Para Athletics coverage of London 2017, as well as presenting the Sports Journalists Award Nominated radio documentary, To Helmand and Back.

He ended the year presenting the 2017 Invictus Games, held in Toronto.

In 2018 he worked across a number of major sporting events, starting as BBC Sports trackside reporter for the World Athletics Indoor Championships, then as 5 Live's main reporter of the 2018 Winter Paralympics - in Pyeongchang, before presenting for BBC Sport's live television coverage of the Commonwealth Games in the Gold Coast and finally presenting BBC1 coverage of the 2018 Invictus Games, in Sydney, with Alex Jones.

Away from sport, Chalmers took part in Pilgrimage: Road to Santiago, where seven celebrities, including Ed Byrne, Neil Morrissey and Debbie McGee tackled a medieval pilgrimage, across the North of Spain, to see whether it still has relevance today. As well as taking on more roles as part of the BBC Events Team, including Trooping the Colour and the commemorations to mark the 75th Anniversary of the D-Day landings. He was honoured to be chosen to narrate Scotland Remembers 100 Years of Armistice, a nationally broadcast service from Glasgow Cathedral.

In 2019 he added cycling to his portfolio of sports coverage, as a part of the BBC's team working on RideLondon, 2019 UCI Road World Championships and Glasgow Track Cycling World Cup.

On 3 September 2020 it was announced that Chalmers would be taking part in the eighteenth series of Strictly Come Dancing. He danced with professional Amy Dowden. He was eliminated in the quarter finals of the competition, after losing the dance-off to Jamie Laing and Karen Hauer.

In March 2021 the BBC announced that Chalmers would be joining Sarah Moore and Jacqui Joseph as a presenter on Money For Nothing when the series returns later this spring. In April Chalmers was part of the BBC presentation team covering the funeral of Prince Philip, Duke of Edinburgh. On 24 June Chalmers was announced as one of the presenters for BBC coverage of the 2020 Summer Olympics to be held in Tokyo. He was coincidently flown out to Tokyo by the same pilot who flew him home from Afghanistan while in a medically induced coma.

In early 2022 Chalmers presented Dunkirk: Mission Impossible; a three-part television series focusing on the events of Operation Dynamo - the evacuation of Allied soldiers during World War II from the beaches and harbour of Dunkirk. In April 2022 Chalmers appeared on BBC's Gardeners' World, introducing the garden at his family home of six years, in Fife, Scotland.

Personal life
Chalmers is married to Kornelia; they have a daughter and a son together.

References

External links
 
 

1987 births
Living people
People from Edinburgh
People educated at Strathallan School
Alumni of the University of Edinburgh
British people with disabilities
British television presenters
Paralympic Games broadcasters
21st-century Royal Marines personnel
Royal Navy personnel of the War in Afghanistan (2001–2021)
Royal Marines ranks
Television presenters with disabilities
BBC sports presenters and reporters